The International Sports Sciences Association is an organization that operates as an education and certification company for fitness trainers, personal trainers, strength and conditioning coaches, nutritionists, nutrition coaches, aerobic instructors, and medical professionals.

The ISSA offers a general fitness certification course for personal training and ten specialized fitness certification courses, including fitness nutrition, sports nutrition, strength and conditioning, bodybuilding, transformation, exercise therapy, senior fitness and youth fitness. The student obtains the status of “Coach” after completion of two specializations, ”Elite Trainer" after completion of three courses and "Master Trainer" after completion of six courses.

Instruction is based on exercise assessment, nutritional planning, fitness instruction, sports medicine practice, and post-rehabilitation training.  The school has enrolled over 300,000 students, both in fitness education and continuing education courses.

History
No official requirements or standards of physical training existed until the fitness boom of the 1980s.  The International Sports Sciences Association was founded in 1988, when, "recognizing the need for standardization and credibility, Dr. Sal Arria and Dr. Frederick Hatfield created a personal fitness training program to merge gym experience with practical and applied sciences."  In keeping with this standard, the ISSA became a Provisional Affiliate of the National Board of Fitness Examiners in 2004.

The National Board of Fitness Examiners was founded to develop nationally based and uniform standards of practice for personal fitness trainers to be used to administer an NBFE provided written and practical examination followed by registration of those who successfully pass the test process. Under NBFE’s procedure, preparation for the NBFE examination can take several forms and includes training through a number of affiliated organizations who themselves include certifying organizations for fitness professionals, including the ISSA.  In 2009, the ISSA became the first fitness organization to earn accreditation by a federally recognized accrediting agency—the Distance Education and Training Council (an accrediting agency recognized by the United States Department of Education and the Council for Higher Education Accreditation).

As a result, the ISSA was added to the list of GI Jobs' Military Friendly Schools in 2010, being approved by the Department of Defense for the Defense Activity for Non-Traditional Education Support (DANTES) to accept U.S. Armed Forces Tuition Assistance and the Military Spouse Career Advancement Account (MyCAA) Financial Assistance program.

Divisions
 Public Division: no restrictions, open to current students, current members, and the general public.
Primary function: to encourage enrollment in ISSA education programs...[and] provide information via articles and links on health and fitness.
 Education Division: access restricted to students enrolled in ISSA education courses, and ISSA certified members in good standing.
Primary function: to provide specialized education in health and fitness.
 Professional Division: Exam access for ISSA students qualified to sit for final exam, full access for ISSA certified members in good standing.
Primary function: To administer final exams, issue certifications, [and] oversee maintenance of professional status.

Accreditation and affiliations
ISSA is registered with the Better Business Bureau and has been awarded the highest company rating of A+.  The ISSA is approved by the New York Chiropractic College for Postgraduate and Continuing Education. The ISSA is also a Provisional Affiliate of the National Board of Fitness Examiners (NFBE).

Affiliation with U.S. service members
The ISSA is recognized by the Defense Activity for Non-traditional Education Support (DANTES) as a Nationally Accredited Distance Learning Program for Military Service Members.  It is also approved for Armed Forces Tuition Assistance and Military Spouse Financial Assistance (MyCAA). "The ISSA is also GI Bill approved by the Bureau for Private and Postsecondary Vocational Education (BPPVE) under contract with the Veterans Administration. Active military, veterans, and eligible spouses and dependents can receive reimbursement from the Veterans Administration for testing fees for any ISSA fitness certification courses."

See also
 American Council on Exercise
 Educational accreditation
 Personal trainer

References

External links
 Official website

Sports medicine organizations
Sports organizations established in 1988
Athletic training
International organizations based in the United States
International medical and health organizations
1988 establishments in the United States
Distance Education Accreditation Commission